Spanish philosophy is the philosophical tradition of the people of territories that make up the modern day nation of Spain and of its citizens abroad.  Although Spanish philosophical thought had a profound influence on philosophical traditions throughout Latin America, political turmoil within Spain throughout the 20th century diminished the influence of Spanish philosophy in international contexts.  Within Spain during this period, fictional novels written with philosophical underpinnings were influential, leading to some of the first modernist European novels, such as the works of Miguel de Unamuno and Pío Baroja.

Despite writing his work in Latin, Francisco Suárez was an influential Spanish philosopher, influencing philsopers such as Leibniz, Grotius, Samuel Pufendorf, Schopenhauer, and Martin Heidegger.[2] Like Suárez, other notable philosophers at the time who studied at the University of Salamanca were Luis de Molina, Francisco de Vitoria, Domingo de Soto, and Martín de Azpilcueta.

Another school of thought, the School of Madrid, founded by José Ortega y Gasset included thinkers like Manuel García Morente, Joaquim Xirau, Xavier Zubiri, José Luis Aranguren, Francisco Ayala, Pedro Laín Entralgo, Manuel Granell, Antonio Rodríguez Huéscar and their most prominent disciple, Julián Marías. [3][4] 

More recently, Fernando Savater, Gustavo Bueno, and Antonio Escohotado have emerged as prominent philosophers.[5]

See also
School of Salamanca

References

 
Spanish literature
Cultural history of Spain
Spanish culture